Ibambi is a community in the Democratic Republic of the Congo.

Missionary activity

The missionary Charles Studd built up an extensive missionary outreach based on his centre at Ibambi in Budu territory. He was buried there after his death in July 1931.
The missionary doctor Helen Roseveare built a combination hospital/ training center in Ibambi in the early 1950s.
The CECCA, the local branch of WEC International, operates a secondary school at Ibambi which serves as a college for primary school teachers.

References

Populated places in Haut-Uélé